Leonid Drachevsky (Russian name: Леонид Вадимович Драчевский; born 5 April 1942) is a Soviet rower from Kazakhstan. He competed at the 1968 Summer Olympics in Mexico City with the men's coxed pair where they qualified for the small final but did not start.

Drachevsky later became a diplomat and served as consul in Barcelona in 1992 and as ambassador of Russia to Poland from 1996 to 1999. In 1998 and 1999, he was a Deputy Foreign Minister of the Russian Federation. In the period 2000-2004, he was the Plenipotentiary Representative of the President of Russia in the Siberian Federal District. On 23 December 2000, Leonid Drachevsky was promoted to the civilian service rank of 1st class Active State Councillor of the Russian Federation.

References

|-

1942 births
Living people
1st class Active State Councillors of the Russian Federation
Ambassador Extraordinary and Plenipotentiary (Russian Federation)
Soviet male rowers
Olympic rowers of the Soviet Union
Rowers at the 1968 Summer Olympics
Sportspeople from Almaty
Ambassadors of Russia to Poland